NGC 4697 (also known as Caldwell 52) is an elliptical galaxy some 40 to 50 million light-years away in the constellation Virgo.  It is a member of the NGC 4697 Group, a group of galaxies also containing NGC 4731 and several generally much smaller galaxies   This group is about 55 million light-years away; it is one of the many Virgo II Groups, which form a southern extension of the Virgo Supercluster of galaxies.

The distance to NGC 4697 is not known with high precision: measurements vary from 28 to 76 million light-years.  According to the NASA Extra-galactic Database, the average is about 38 million light-years;  according to SIMBAD, about 50 million light-years.

Gallery

References

External links
 

Elliptical galaxies
Virgo (constellation)
4697
052
043276
UGCA objects